Ingomar the Barbarian is an 1851 historical play by the British writer and former actress Maria Ann Lovell. It was based on the German play Der Sohn der Wildnis by Friedrich Halm. It premiered at the Theatre Royal, Drury Lane on 9 June 1851. The original cast included John Garside Neville as the Timarch of Masillia, James Robertson Anderson as Ingomar and Charlotte Vandenhoff as Parthenia. It appeared frequently on the American stage for the remainder of the nineteenth century.

Adaptation
In 1908 it provided the basis for the American short silent film Ingomar, the Barbarian directed by D. W. Griffith.

References

Bibliography
 Jackson, Allan Stuart. The Standard Theatre of Victorian England. Fairleigh Dickinson Univ Press, 1993.
 Mayer, David. Stagestruck Filmmaker: D. W. Griffith and the American Theatre. University of Iowa Press, 2009.

1851 plays
West End plays
British plays
Historical plays